Buffalo Park is a cricket ground located in East London, Eastern Cape, South Africa. It is one of the home grounds for the Warriors cricket team, and the principal home ground for Border. It can hold up to 20,000 spectators.

Buffalo Park superseded the Jan Smuts Ground in East London as Border's main home ground in the 1987–88 season. It has hosted one Test match, in October 2002, and hosted a number of One Day Internationals.

It was also known as Mercedes-Benz Park, thanks to sponsorship from the German motor manufacturer.

International five-wicket hauls

Six five-wicket hauls have been taken on the ground.

Test matches

One Day Internationals

Twenty20 Internationals

See also
 List of Test cricket grounds

References

External links
Cricinfo's Buffalo Park page
 Cricket Archive page

Cricket grounds in South Africa
East London, Eastern Cape
Test cricket grounds in South Africa
Sports venues in the Eastern Cape
2003 Cricket World Cup stadiums